Dusen is a surname. Notable people with the surname include:

Frankie Dusen (1878–1936), American trombonist
Augustus S. F. X. Van Dusen, fictional character in a series of detective short stories and two novels by Jacques Futrelle
Callendar–Van Dusen equation describes the relationship between resistance and temperature of platinum resistance thermometers
Chris Van Dusen, American television screenwriter
Clyde Van Dusen (1886–1951), American jockey and trainer of Thoroughbred racehorses
Clyde Van Dusen (horse) (1926–1948), American Thoroughbred racehorse and the winner of the 1929 Kentucky Derby
Francis Lund Van Dusen (1912–1993), United States federal judge
Fred Van Dusen (1937–2018), former Major League Baseball player
George W. Van Dusen (1826–1915), grain dealer who become rich from the milling boom in Minnesota
Granville Van Dusen (born 1944), actor and voice actor who portrayed Race Bannon
Julie Van Dusen, Canadian journalist who works for CBC News
Willis Van Dusen, the mayor of Astoria, Oregon

See also
George W. and Nancy B. Van Dusen House, mansion in the Stevens Square neighborhood of Minneapolis, Minnesota
Van Dusen v. Barrack, 376 U.S. 612 (1964), case decided by the United States Supreme Court